Marcos Orlando Letelier del Solar (13 April, 1932 – 21 September, 1976) was a Chilean economist, politician and diplomat during the presidency of Salvador Allende. A refugee from the military dictatorship of General Augusto Pinochet, Letelier accepted several academic positions in Washington, D.C. following his exile from Chile. In 1976, agents of Dirección de Inteligencia Nacional (DINA), the Pinochet regime's secret police, assassinated Letelier in Washington via the use of a car bomb. These agents had been working in collaboration with members of the Coordination of United Revolutionary Organizations, an anti-Castro militant group.

Background
Sergio Orlando Letelier del Solar was born in Temuco, Chile, the youngest child of Orlando Letelier Ruiz and Inés del Solar. He studied at the Instituto Nacional and, at the age of sixteen, was accepted as a cadet at the Chilean Military Academy, where he completed his secondary studies. Later, he abandoned a military career. He did not finish college and never received a university degree. In 1955, he joined the recently formed Copper Office (Departamento del Cobre, now CODELCO), where he worked until 1959 as a research analyst in the copper industry.

On 17 December 1955, Letelier married Isabel Margarita Morel Gumucio with whom he had four children: Cristián, José, Francisco, and Juan Pablo.

That year, Letelier was fired from the Copper Office, ostensibly for having supported Salvador Allende's unsuccessful second presidential campaign. The Letelier family left for Venezuela, where Orlando became a copper consultant to the Finance Ministry.

Political career

While at university, Letelier became a student representative in the University of Chile's Student Union. In 1959, he joined the Chilean Socialist Party (PS). In 1971, President Allende appointed him ambassador to the United States. His specific mission was to advocate in defense of the Chilean nationalization of copper, which had replaced the private ownership model favoured by the US government.

In 1973, Letelier was recalled to Chile and served successively as Minister of Foreign Affairs, the Interior and Defense.

In the coup d'état of 11 September 1973, he was the first high-ranking member of the Allende administration to be arrested. He was held for twelve months in various concentration camps and suffered severe torture: first at the Tacna Regiment, then at the Military Academy; later he was sent for eight months to a political prison on Dawson Island; from there he was transferred to the basement of the Air Force War Academy, and finally to the concentration camp of Ritoque. Following international diplomatic pressure, especially from Diego Arria, then Governor of Distrito Federal of Venezuela, he was released in September 1974 on the condition that he immediately leave Chile.

After his release, he and his family resettled in Caracas, but later moved to the United States on the recommendation of American writer Saul Landau.

In 1975, Letelier moved to Washington D.C., where he became senior fellow of the Washington, D.C.-based Institute for Policy Studies, a think tank Landau was involved in. Letelier became director of the Amsterdam-based Transnational Institute and taught at the School of International Service of the American University in Washington, D.C.

Letelier wrote several articles criticizing the "Chicago Boys", a group of South American economists trained at the University of Chicago by Milton Friedman and Arnold Harberger who returned to their home countries to promote and advise leaders on the benefits of a free-market economy.

This economic model was used to great effect in Chile where General Pinochet sought to dismantle the country's socialist economic system and replace it with a free market economy. Letelier believed that in a resource driven economy such as Chile, allowing markets to operate freely simply guaranteed the movement of wealth from the lower and middle classes to the monopolists and financial speculators. He soon became the leading voice of the Chilean resistance, preventing several loans (especially from Europe) from being awarded to the Chilean government. On 10 September 1976, he was stripped of his Chilean nationality.

Death

Letelier was killed by a car bomb explosion on 21 September 1976 in Sheridan Circle in Washington, D.C., along with his American co-worker, Ronni Karpen Moffitt.

Moffitt's husband, Michael Moffitt, was injured but survived. Several people were prosecuted and convicted for the murder. Among them were Michael Townley, a U.S. expatriate working for DINA, General Manuel Contreras, former head of DINA, and Brigadier Pedro Espinoza, also formerly of DINA. Townley was convicted in the United States in 1978 and served 62 months in prison for the murder; he is now free as a participant in the United States Federal Witness Protection Program. Contreras and Espinoza were convicted in Chile in 1993.

During the FBI investigation into the assassination, documents in Letelier's possession were copied and leaked to journalists Rowland Evans and Robert Novak of The Washington Times and Jack Anderson by the FBI before being returned to his widow. The documents purportedly show Letelier was working with Eastern Bloc Intelligence agencies for a decade and coordinating his activities with the surviving political leadership of the  Popular Unity coalition exiled in East Berlin. The FBI suspected that these individuals had been recruited by the Stasi. Documents in the briefcase showed that Letelier had maintained contact with Salvador Allende’s daughter, Beatriz Allende who was married to Cuban DGI station chief Luis Fernandez Ona.

Letelier's funeral was held at St. Matthew's Cathedral in Washington D.C., followed by a march to the site of the car-bombing at Sheridan Circle on Massachusetts Avenue, where folksinger Joan Baez sang in honor of Letelier. Several thousand U.S. citizens and Chilean exiles took part.

Diego Arria intervened again by bringing Letelier's body to Caracas for burial, where he remained until 1994 after the end of Pinochet's rule.

General Augusto Pinochet, who died on 10 December 2006, was never brought to trial for the murders, despite evidence implicating him as having ordered them. Following the assassination, the United States cut military aid to Chile, and took a stance of 'unobtrusiveness' within the country.

Aftermath

Following the death of Pinochet in December 2006, the Institute for Policy Studies (IPS), for which both Letelier and Moffitt worked, called for the release of all classified documents relating to the Letelier–Moffitt assassination.

According to the IPS, the Clinton administration de-classified more than 16,000 documents relating to Chile, but withheld documents relating to the Letelier-Moffitt assassination in Washington on the grounds that they were associated with an ongoing investigation. The IPS said the Clinton administration had re-opened the investigation into the Letelier-Moffitt murders and sent agents to Chile to gather additional evidence that Pinochet had authorized the crime. The former Chilean Secret Police Chief, Manuel Contreras, who was convicted for his role in the crime in 1993, later pointed the finger at his superiors, claiming that all relevant orders had come from Pinochet.

Subsequent disclosures

A US State Department document made available by the National Security Archive on 10 April 2010 reveals that a démarche protesting Pinochet's Operation Condor assassination program was proposed and sent on 23 August 1976 to US diplomatic missions in Uruguay, Argentina, and Chile to be delivered to their host governments but later rescinded on 16 September 1976 by Henry Kissinger, following concerns raised by US ambassadors assigned there of both personal safety and a likely diplomatic contretemps. Five days later, the Letelier assassination took place.

Documents released in 2015 revealed a CIA report dated 28 April 1978, which showed that the agency by then had knowledge that Pinochet ordered the murders. The report stated, "Contreras told a confidante he authorized the assassination of Letelier on orders from Pinochet." A State Department document also referred to eight separate CIA reports from around the same date, each sourced to "extremely sensitive informants" who provided evidence of Pinochet's direct involvement in ordering the assassination and in directing the subsequent cover-up.

During the tenure of Richard Downie at the William J. Perry Center for Hemispheric Defense Studies, a U.S. Southern Command educational institution located at the National Defense University, the alleged (and as yet unproven) role of Jaime Garcia Covarrubias, a Chilean professor who was head of counterintelligence for DINA in the 1970s, in the torture and murder of seven detainees was revealed inside the center. His alleged role was first brought to Downie's attention in early 2008 by Center Assistant Professor Martin Edwin Andersen, a senior staff member who earlier, as a senior advisor for policy planning at the Criminal Division of the U.S. Department of Justice, was the first national security whistleblower to receive the U.S. Office of Special Counsel's "Public Servant Award." In an October 1987 investigative report in The Nation, Andersen broke the story of how, in a June 1976 meeting in the Hotel Carrera in Santiago, Kissinger gave the bloody military junta in neighboring Argentina the "green light" for their own dirty "war."

See also
 Chile under Pinochet
 Chilean political scandals
 National Security Archive
 Journalist Robert Novak's involvement in the Orlando Letelier assassination
 State terrorism
 Terrorism

Citations

General and cited references 
 Dinges, John, and Landau, Saul. Assassination on Embassy Row (London, 1981) , (McGraw-Hill, 1981)
 Dinges, John. The Condor Years (The New Press: 2004) 
 Hitchens, Christopher, The Trial of Henry Kissinger, (Verso Books: 2001) 
 Taylor Branch and Eugene M  Labyrinth (Viking Press 1983, Penguin Books 1983)

External links
 Orlando Letelier's article "The ‘Chicago Boys’ in Chile: Economic Freedom’s Awful Toll", TheNation.com, 28 August 1976 / 21 September 2016.
 Orlando Letelier Archive held by the Transnational Institute.
 MIPT Terrorism Knowledge Base Nine legal documents from the trials of Letelier's assassins.  Includes trial transcripts.
 Institute for Policy Studies, where Letelier and Moffitt worked at the time, gives circumstances surrounding bombing.
 John Dinges John Dinges was a correspondent for The Washington Post in South America from 1975 to 1983, author of The Condor Years: How Pinochet and his Allies Brought Terrorism to Three Continents (The New Press 2004) and with Saul Landau Assassination on Embassy Row (Pantheon Books 1980), (Asesinato en Washington, Lasser 1980, Planeta 1990)
 Biography at Memoria Chilena
 
 New Docs Show Kissinger Rescinded Warning on Assassinations Days Before Letelier Bombing – video report by Democracy Now!, 12 April 2010
  Remembrance of the Assignation – Video report by The Washington Post, 18 September 2016

 
 

 
 

 
 

1932 births
1976 deaths
1976 murders in the United States
American University faculty and staff
Assassinated Chilean politicians
Assassinated diplomats
Ambassadors of Chile to the United States
Chilean democracy activists
Chilean diplomats
Chilean terrorism victims
Chilean people murdered abroad
Chilean Ministers of Defense
Chilean torture victims
Chilean Ministers of the Interior
Foreign ministers of Chile
Deaths by car bomb in the United States
Presidency of Salvador Allende
Socialist Party of Chile politicians
People from Temuco
People killed in Operation Condor
People murdered in Washington, D.C.
Terrorism deaths in Washington, D.C.
Instituto Nacional General José Miguel Carrera alumni
University of Chile alumni
Victims of human rights abuses